This list is an attempt to document every song recorded and released under the name of Carl Wilson, whether on an album, single, compilation or anthology album.

 
Wilson, Carl
The Beach Boys